is a former Japanese football player.

Club statistics
Updated to 31 December 2018.

1Includes J2/J3 Playoffs.

References

External links

Profile at FC Machida Zelvia

1980 births
Living people
Aichi Gakuin University alumni
Association football people from Gifu Prefecture
Japanese footballers
J1 League players
J2 League players
J3 League players
Júbilo Iwata players
Hokkaido Consadole Sapporo players
Shimizu S-Pulse players
FC Machida Zelvia players
Association football goalkeepers